Cibak (variously rendered Chibuk, Chibok, Chibbak, Chibbuk, Kyibaku, Kibbaku, Kikuk) is an Afro-Asiatic language spoken by about 200,000 who are majorly Kibaku people in Nigeria.

Cibak is spoken in Askira/Uba, Chibok and Damboa local government areas in the south of Borno State in Nigeria. The majority of speakers are Christians (about 92 %); most of the schoolgirls abducted in the 2014 Chibok kidnapping by Boko Haram were Cibak-speakers and Christians.

References

Notes

Biu-Mandara languages
Languages of Nigeria